Kreminets is a village in Marinka Raion (district) in Donetsk Oblast of eastern Ukraine, at 23.7 km WSW from the centre of Donetsk city.

Kreminets borders from north-east with the Petrovsky District of Donetsk city. Pro-Russian forces took the village under their control during the War in Donbass that started in mid-April 2014.

Demographics
Native language as of the Ukrainian Census of 2001:
Ukrainian 31.36%
Russian 67.75%
Belorussian 0.89%

References

External links
 Weather forecast for Kreminets

Villages in Kalmiuske Raion